is a former Japanese football player. She played for Japan national team.

Club career
Matsunaga was born on August 10, 1971. She played for Yomiuri Nippon Beleza from 1984. In L.League from 1989, she played 65 matches for the club in 5 season. She retired end of 1993 season.

National team career
On June 1, 1988, when Matsunaga was 16 years old, she debuted for Japan national team against United States. She played at 1989, 1991 AFC Championship and 1990 Asian Games. She played 13 games for Japan until 1991.

National team statistics

References

1971 births
Living people
Japanese women's footballers
Japan women's international footballers
Nippon TV Tokyo Verdy Beleza players
Asian Games silver medalists for Japan
Asian Games medalists in football
Women's association footballers not categorized by position
Footballers at the 1990 Asian Games
Medalists at the 1990 Asian Games